The 2008–09 Tulane Green Wave women's basketball team will represent Tulane University in the 2008–09 NCAA Division I women's basketball season. The Green Wave were coached by Lisa Stockton. The Green Wave are a member of Conference USA and attempted to win the Conference-USA championship.

Offseason

Exhibition

Preseason WNIT

Regular season

Roster

Schedule
The Green Wave hosted the UNO-Tulane Big Easy Classic on December 6, 2008. In addition, the Green Wave also hosted the Tulane Double Tree Classic from December 20 to December 21.
 On January 9, Brett Benzio had seven blocked seven shots against Houston.

Player stats

March 4: Indira Kaljo was named the Conference USA Newcomer of the Year. She was a transfer from Ventura College in California. Statistically, she has posted three-point shooting numbers on pace to set Tulane records in career three-point percentage. During the season, Kaljo ranked 14th in the NCAA in three-point percentage at .428 (62-of-145) and third in C-USA (which has lower per game requirements for rankings). Kaljo's 62 three-pointers are tied for fourth most in Tulane single-season history with Nikki Luckhurst (2007–08). Her 2.07 made three-pointers per game are third in C-USA.
Ashley Langford finished her Tulane career by setting new single-season assist records. She has had 10 games with 10 or more assists, and holds 10 of the top 13 single-game assists records. Her 722 assists have led to 1,685 Tulane points (280 layups, 202 jumpers, 228 three-pointers). During this season, she reached the 1,000-point plateau. Between points and assists combined, Langford has led to 2,732 of Tulane's 8,021 points (34.0 percent).
Brett Benzio averaged 9.3 rebounds per game in her freshman year. Among all freshmen in the NCAA, her average was tied for second with Ashley Palmer of Long Island, only 0.2 rebounds back of UNLV's Jamie Smith. The 296 rebounds she gained during the season were the fourth most in a single-season in Tulane history, and the most ever among freshmen. She averaged 8.9 points per game, and was the only freshman in the nation averaging a double-double before a mid-January bout with mono limited her productivity. In addition, she ranked seventh in C-USA with 1.47 blocks per game. She turned in nine double-doubles with 13 double-digit scoring games and 15 double-figure rebounding games.

Postseason

Conference USA Tournament
March 3:The Conference USA Women's Basketball Championship will be hosted by Tulane's Fogelman Arena for the first time since 1999. The tournament will be played from March 5–8.
March 5:The sixth seeded Green Wave played its first game of the Conference USA Tournament and beat Tulsa 49-44. Brett Benzio recorded a double-double with 10 points and 10 rebounds, while Indira Kaljo scored 12 points. The victory was Lisa Stockton's 300th win at Tulane.
The Green Wave forced 22 Tulsa turnovers. In the second half, the Green Wave scored the first fifteen points.
March 6: The Green Wave fell in the C-USA tournament at Fogelman Arena for the first time. Southern Mississippi picked up their first win over Tulane in New Orleans since 1997 with a 72–55 win in the quarterfinals of the C-USA tournament.
Brittany Lindsey led Tulane with 16 points and tied her career-high in rebounds with 11. Junior guard Indira Kaljo added 12 points. Senior Ashley Langford handed out seven assists to finish with 722 for her career. Langford finishes her Tulane career 19th in scoring with 1,047 points.

Awards and honors
Brett Benzio, Conference USA All-Freshmen Team
Brett Benzio, Doubletree Classic All-Tournament Team
Brett Benzio, Doubletree Classic Most Valuable Player
Brett Benzio, Honorable Mention list by the Louisiana Sports Writer's Association
Indira Kaljo, Conference USA Newcomer of the Year
Ashley Langford, recipient of the Conference USA Spirit of Service award
Ashley Langford, Conference USA Scholar Athlete for Women's Basketball
Ashley Langford, Doubletree Classic All-Tournament Team
Ashley Langford, Third Team All-Louisiana

Team players drafted into the WNBA
No one from the Green Wave was selected in the 2009 WNBA Draft.

See also
Tulane Green Wave

References

Tulane
Tulane Green Wave women's basketball seasons
Tulane
Tulane